Gabriel Morrissette (born September 26, 1959) is a Canadian illustrator, animator and comic book artist from Montreal, Quebec, Canada. Currently working for Jackfruit Press on their Prime Minister series and Chickadee on Daisy Dreamer, Gabriel co-created Northguard, Fleur de Lys and Angloman with Mark Shainblum.

Gabriel has worked for several comic book publishers, including DC Comics and Marvel Comics, and has illustrated such characters as Spider-Man 2099, Doc Savage, Ragman and Checkmate. His animation work includes Savage Dragon and credit as a storyboard artist on a number of episodes of The Boy for Cactus. They are currently working on Planet of the Apes for Mr.Comics.

See also
 Canadian Comics Creators

External links
Northguard website
Angloman website
Jackfruit Press website
Comicopia website

1959 births
Artists from Montreal
Canadian animators
Canadian cartoonists
Canadian comics artists
Canadian storyboard artists
Living people